The Great Spa Towns of Europe is a transnational World Heritage Site consisting of a selection of 11 spa towns across seven European countries. They were developed around natural mineral water springs. From the early 18th century to the 1930s, Western Europe experienced an increase in spa and bathing culture, leading to the construction of elaborate bath houses. These would often include gardens, casinos, theatres, and villas surrounding the springs and the bath houses.

Nomination
The city of Bath was originally inscribed on UNESCO's World Heritage List in 1987.

The efforts to get the Great Spas of Europe onto the World Heritage List began in 2012, and the nomination was submitted in 2019. On 24 July 2021, the Great Spas of Europe were officially inscribed on the World Heritage List.

List of spa towns

Maps

References

External links
 
 The Great Spa Towns of Europe UNESCO collection on Google Arts and Culture

World Heritage Sites in Europe
Spas